The Battle of Kiên Long was an early engagement of the Vietnam War. It was initiated by the Viet Cong (VC) invasion of the Kiên Long district in the Chương Thiện Province of South Vietnam.

Battle
On April 12, 1964, three battalions of VC invaded Kiên Long, quickly overrunning the entire district. Upon gaining control of Kien Long, they executed the district chief and his family. The Army of the Republic of Vietnam (ARVN), augmented by U.S. air support, responded to the invasion in force. Although the Viet Cong were operating in the daytime, they were able to hold their own against both the ARVN and the American aircraft. After eight days of fierce combat in which heavy casualties were inflicted on both sides, the VC abandoned the district and were able to withdraw from Kien Long in an orderly fashion.

Aftermath
Both the ARVN and VC took heavy casualties in the fight for Kien Long. Nationwide, the ARVN took one thousand casualties (200 dead, 660 wounded, and 140 missing) from April 12 to April 20; a quarter of these were suffered at Kien Long. Additionally, the battle held major strategic significance as it marked one of the first times that large numbers of VC operated simultaneously and openly in broad daylight.

References 

1964 in Vietnam
Battles and operations of the Vietnam War
Battles involving the United States
Battles and operations of the Vietnam War in 1964
April 1964 events in Asia
History of Hậu Giang Province